Borralha was a freguesia ("civil parish") in Águeda Municipality, Aveiro District, Portugal. It had an area of 9.6 km2 and in 2011 had a population of 2230.

History 
In 2013 it was merged with Águeda to form the new freguesia of Águeda e Borralha.

Places 
 Agueiro
 Alteiralto
 Alto do Vale do Grou
 Amaínho
 Brejo
 Candam
 Carrasqueira
 Casais
 Casarão Castinceira
 Catraia
 Chapado
 Horta Velha
 Lomba
 Machuqueira
 Nova Borralha
 Pinheirais
 Redolho
 S. Tiago
 Vale do Forno
 Vista

Demography

Religion 
The Portuguese Roman Catholic Church's Diocese of Aveiro includes the Parish of Borralha as part of the archpriestship of Águeda.

References 

Former parishes of Águeda
2013 disestablishments in Portugal
Populated places disestablished in 2013